3988 Huma, provisional designation , is an eccentric sub-kilometer asteroid and near-Earth object of the Amor group. It was discovered on 4 June 1986, by American astronomer Eleanor Helin at Palomar Observatory, California. The asteroid measures approximately 700 to 800 meters in diameter and was named after the Huma bird from Iranian mythology.

Orbit and classification 

Huma is a stony S-type asteroid that orbits the Sun in the inner main-belt at a distance of 1.1–2.0 AU once every 1 years and 11 months (701 days). Its orbit has an eccentricity of 0.32 and an inclination of 11° with respect to the ecliptic. As no precoveries were taken, the body's observation arc begins with its discovery observation at Palomar in 1986.

Physical characteristics

Rotation period 

A rotational lightcurve of Huma was obtained by American astronomer Brian A. Skiff in July 2011. It gave a rotation period of  hours with a brightness variation of 0.24 magnitude.

Diameter and albedo 

In the 1990s, Dutch–American astronomer Tom Gehrels estimated Huma to measure 0.7 kilometers in diameter, based on an assumed medium albedo of 0.15. More recently, the Collaborative Asteroid Lightcurve Link assumed a standard albedo for stony asteroids of 0.20 and calculated a diameter of 0.78 kilometers.

Naming 

This minor planet was named after the Huma bird from Persian mythology and Sufi poetry. The mythological bird never alights on the ground, and its appearance in the sky is said to be a sign of fortune. The asteroid's name was suggested by the SGAC Name An Asteroid Campaign and its citation was published on 9 September 2014.

Notes

References

External links 
 Asteroid Lightcurve Database (LCDB), query form (info )
 Dictionary of Minor Planet Names, Google books
 Asteroids and comets rotation curves, CdR – Observatoire de Genève, Raoul Behrend
 
 
 

003988
Discoveries by Eleanor F. Helin
Named minor planets
19860604